"Vertigini" (Italian for "Dizziness") is the fourth single by Noemi.

The song 
The song was released on 7 May 2010, but because of some problems between radio and recordings, it was re-released on 14 May.

"Vertigini" was written by Massimiliano Calò, Giuseppe Romanelli and Diego Calvetti, and produced by Diego Calvetti. The song is the second single from Sulla mia pelle (Deluxe Edition).

Track listing
Digital download

Other versions
"Vertigini" has two versions:
 "Vertigini" (length 3:21) contained in Noemi
 "Vertigini" (length 3:56) contained in Sulla mia pelle (Deluxe Edition)

References

2010 singles
Noemi (singer) songs
Rhythm and blues ballads
Soul songs
Italian-language songs
Songs written by Diego Calvetti
2010 songs
Sony Music singles